San Giovanni de Butris is a Romanesque-style, Roman Catholic stone church located outside of the town of Acquasparta, on the former via Flaminia, in the Province of Terni, region of Umbria, Italy. 

The stone church was initially built over the structure of an Ancient Roman bridge, which forms the visible base of the structure. It was initially dedicated to San Giovanni Battista, and once belonged to the Knights of Malta.

References

Churches in the province of Terni
Romanesque architecture in Umbria